Edward S. Conroy (born February 17, 1967) is an American college basketball coach who is currently serving his second stint as the head coach of The Citadel Bulldogs. He previously served as the associate head coach for the Vanderbilt Commodores and as an assistant coach for the Minnesota Golden Gophers. Conroy is a former head men's basketball coach at Tulane University, being hired in April 2010. Conroy was officially relieved of his duties as Tulane head coach on March 14, 2016.

Before joining Tulane, he coached four seasons at The Citadel and three seasons at Francis Marion University.

Conroy announced his return to The Citadel on March 23, 2022. During his first stint as head coach there from 2006-2010, he led the Bulldogs to their first 20-win season in over 30 years during the 2008-2009 season, for which he was selected as the SoCon Coach of the Year by the league's head coaches and media members. He was also named the NABC District 22 Coach of the Year, CollegeInsider.com Coach of the Year and the Skip Prosser Man of the Year.

His brother, Duffy, is an assistant coach at Tulsa. Ed is also a first cousin to novelist Pat Conroy.

Head coaching record

References

External links

  Minnesota profile

1967 births
Living people
Basketball coaches from Iowa
Basketball players from Iowa
Coastal Carolina Chanticleers men's basketball coaches
Francis Marion Patriots men's basketball coaches
Furman Paladins men's basketball coaches
Minnesota Golden Gophers men's basketball coaches
NC State Wolfpack men's basketball coaches
Sportspeople from Davenport, Iowa
Tennessee Volunteers basketball coaches
The Citadel Bulldogs basketball coaches
The Citadel Bulldogs basketball players
Tulane Green Wave men's basketball coaches
Tulsa Golden Hurricane men's basketball coaches
VMI Keydets basketball coaches
American men's basketball players